Valley Metro Rail is a light rail transit system that serves the Phoenix metropolitan area in Arizona, United States. The system serves on average over 49,400 weekday riders as of 2016, making it one of the busiest light rail systems in the United States.

Valley Metro Rail opened its initial  starter line on December 27, 2008. The starter line, which was funded through a combination of federal, regional and local municipal funds, operated from the 19th Avenue/Montebello station in Phoenix, through Tempe, serving the Arizona State University Tempe campus, and ended at the Sycamore/Main Street station in Mesa. The starter line provided service to 28 stations in total, which were primarily located on-street at the intersections of major arterial roads every , although mid-block stations are common in areas of higher urban density. On April 8, 2013, the PHX Sky Train people mover opened, providing direct service from the 44th Street/Washington station to Phoenix Sky Harbor International Airport. On August 22, 2015, Valley Metro's first light rail extension, the Central Mesa Extension, opened, which added four new stations on the eastern end of the starter line going through downtown Mesa, including a new terminus at Mesa Drive/Main Street station. The second light rail extension, the Northwest Extension Phase I opened on March 19, 2016, which added three new stations on the western end of the starter line on 19th Avenue, including a new terminus at 19th Avenue/Dunlap station.

Three new stations opened on 2019. Two of these, Stapley/Main Street station and Gilbert Road/Main Street station, are part of the Gilbert Road Extension, which began service at May 2019. The third station, 50th Street/Washington station, is an infill station located between the 44th Street/Washington station and Priest Drive/Washington station in Phoenix. This station opened in April 2019, and was funded by Proposition 104, Phoenix's 2015 ballot initiative that extended and expanded the city's transportation sales tax.

Access is primarily provided at the end of the stations, usually at signalized intersections. All stations maintain a similar design, are ADA accessible and provide level boarding throughout. Each station consists of a platform and an overhead canopy that provides shade and shelter from the weather. Station amenities include seating, trash canisters, a drinking fountain, lighting, digital and vocal rider information, emergency call boxes and public art. Fares can be purchased at the ticket vending machines located at each end of the station platforms. Five of the stations have associated transit centers for transferring between light rail and buses. 10 of the stations have associated park-and-ride facilities that provide approximately 4,500 public parking spaces combined along the entire light rail system.

Valley Metro is currently in various phases of planning and development on six light rail extensions. Three of these extensions have completed a sufficient amount of planning to determine the number of stations they will include. The Gilbert Road Extension, as discussed previously, will add two stations; the Northwest Extension Phase 2 will add three stations; and the South Central Extension will add seven stations. The other two extensions are still going through the station selection process. The Capitol/I-10 West Extension will add approximately ten new light rail stations, while the West Phoenix/Central Glendale Extension will add approximately seven new light rail stations. The Northeast Extension has not begun the planning process, and thus the number of stations have yet to be determined. Valley Metro is also developing the Tempe Streetcar in downtown Tempe, which will have 14 stops along its  alignment. Two of these stops will directly interface with the existing light rail stations at Mill Avenue/Third Street station and Dorsey/Apache Boulevard station. After the completion of all of these extensions and the 50th St/Washington infill station, the Phoenix metropolitan area will have  of light rail and over 65 separate light rail stations. As part of Phoenix's Proposition 104, various new extensions have been proposed, although none of these have been formally adopted by Valley Metro Rail's Board of Directors. , the configuration of the entire system, including the number of distinct light rail services, has yet to be determined.

Stations

Under construction

See also

Transportation in Arizona

Notes

References 

Stations

Lists of railway stations in the United States
Transportation buildings and structures in Phoenix, Arizona
Valley Metro